The Norwegian Missionary Society or the Norwegian Mission Society (NMS) is the first and oldest missionary organization in Norway.

It was started by a group of approximately 180 Stavanger residents in August 1842, to spread Christianity to other people, mainly in Africa. Hans Paludan Smith Schreuder was its first missionary, leaving for the Zulu Kingdom in 1843. It now works in Estonia, the United Kingdom, France, Cameroon, Mali, Ethiopia, South Africa, Madagascar, Brazil, Pakistan, China, Thailand and Japan.

The chairman of the board is Rev. Helge Gaard and Rev. Jeffrey Huseby is the general secretary since 2011.

References

External links
 Official website
 Reichelt Collection 艾香德紀念圖書館藏書 Preservation for the Documentation of Chinese Christianity by Hong Kong Baptist University Library. The Reichelt Collection was originally part of the Karl. L. Reichelt Memorial Library Collections held at the Institute of Sino-Christian Studies (漢語基督教文化研究所).

Christian missions
Lutheran organizations
Organizations established in 1842
Organisations based in Stavanger
1842 establishments in Norway